Haimanti Shukla (Hoimonti Shukla; born 2 December 1949) is a Bengali singer. The tradition of Hindustani classical music was in her family and this helped her to become a classically trained singer. She recorded her first song "E to kanna noy aamar" in 1972.

Early life
She was born in Sirajganj, East Bengal, Dominion of Pakistan (present day Bangladesh) to Harihar Sukla, a noted Hindustani classical vocalist. She received her training from her father.

Career
Her most popular song in Bollywood is Kahan Se Aaye Badra from the movie Chashme Buddoor. Her first Hindi movie song was "Jeevan ki kitabon par" from movie "Amavas ka Chand".
One of her most notable songs is "Amar Bolar Kichu Chilo Na", which was composed by Manna De and released in 1978.

Filmography
Amrita (2012)
Arohon (2010)
Musolmanir Galpo (2010)
1 No. Plum Villa (2009)
Antarotamo (2008)
Gandharbi (2002)
Bhakter Bhagaban (1997)
 Bhalobasa Bhalobasa (1985) 
 Chashme Buddoor (1981)
Darpachurna (1980)
Amavas Ka Chand (1979)
Sister (1977)
Asadharan (1977)
Ami Se O Sakha (1977)

Awards

References

Living people
1949 births
Singers from Kolkata
Bengali singers
Bengali Hindus
Kalakar Awards winners
Indian women classical singers
20th-century Indian singers
21st-century Indian singers
Women musicians from West Bengal
20th-century Indian women singers
21st-century Indian women singers